John James Barralet (c. 1747 - January 16, 1815) was an Irish artist who spent the later part of his career in the United States.

Life
John James Barralet was born in 1747 to a French Family in Dublin. Barralet had joined two classes at The Dublin Society of Drawing schools aged seventeen and he was awarded premium in 1764. He was educated by James Mannin and he was awarded prizes for both 'Drawing of human figures and heads' and 'Inventions in designs and patterns'. He specialised in landscapes, producing prosaic works. He was lauded for his figures which were said to give a lively immediacy to his watercolours. His brother John Melchior Barralet was a teacher in London in The Royal Academy in 1770. He also had a brother Joseph Barralet.

He exhibited three landscapes at the Royal Academy in 1770, and occasionally exhibited in succeeding years. He was employed in illustrating books on Irish Antiquities. In 1795 he emigrated to America, settling in Philadelphia, where he died in 1815.

References

Sources

Further reading

1740s births
1815 deaths
18th-century Irish painters
19th-century Irish painters
Irish male painters
Artists from Dublin (city)
19th-century Irish male artists